This Way is an album by Acoustic Alchemy, released on 14 May 2007 in the United Kingdom.
It was released on 6 June 2007 in the United States.

On 4 February 2007 Acoustic Alchemy announced that they had recently completed recording the new album, comprising eleven tracks. It features special guest appearances from trumpeter Rick Braun (on the track "Carlos The King"), saxophonist Jeff Kashiwa (on "Egg") and collaborations with label-mates Down to the Bone.

The album was their first to be released on Narada Jazz.

Track listing

References

Acoustic Alchemy albums
2007 albums
Narada Productions albums